Pavlo Serhiyovych Shushko (born 7 May 2000) is a Ukrainian professional footballer who plays as a centre-back for Mariupol in the Ukrainian First League.

Career
Shushko is a product of the Atlet Kyiv and Shakhtar Donetsk youth sportive school systems.

He played for FC Shakhtar and FC Mariupol in the Ukrainian Premier League Reserves and made his debut for FC Mariupol in the Ukrainian Premier League as a second half-time substituted player in the losing home match against FC Shakhtar Donetsk on 10 April 2021.

References

External links
 
 

2000 births
Living people
Sportspeople from Kherson Oblast
Ukrainian footballers
Association football defenders
Ukraine youth international footballers
FC Shakhtar Donetsk players
FC Mariupol players
FC Kramatorsk players
FC Yarud Mariupol players
Ukrainian Premier League players
Ukrainian First League players